Claude Rouer (25 October 1929 – 23 July 2021) was a road cyclist from France, who at the 1952 Summer Olympics won the bronze medal in the men's team road race, alongside Jacques Anquetil and Alfred Tonello. He was a professional rider from 1953 to 1955. In 1953, he was the lanterne rouge of the Tour de France.

References

External links
 

1929 births
2021 deaths
French male cyclists
Cyclists at the 1952 Summer Olympics
Olympic cyclists of France
Olympic bronze medalists for France
Cyclists from Paris
Olympic medalists in cycling
Medalists at the 1952 Summer Olympics